Belden Incorporated is an American manufacturer of networking, connectivity, and cable products. The company designs, manufactures, and markets  signal transmission products for demanding applications. These products serve the industrial automation, enterprise, security, transportation, infrastructure, and residential markets.  Belden is one of the largest U.S.-based manufacturers of high-speed electronic cables primarily used in industrial, enterprise, and broadcast markets.

Structure
Belden is headquartered in St. Louis, Missouri. Its president and CEO is Ashish Chand.

Belden operates in three regions:
 The Americas
 Europe, Middle East and Africa (EMEA)
 Asia Pacific

PPC Belden
PPC, a division of Belden, holds a number of patents for connector technology and has pioneered advancements for various industries.  PPC Belden's innovations include the Universal Compression Connector, the wireless compression connector for the wireless industry and a locking HDMI connector. It was purchased by Belden in 2012. PPC Belden has its headquarters in East Syracuse, New York.

History
Belden was founded in Chicago in 1902. It was acquired by Crouse-Hinds Company in 1980; Crouse-Hinds was acquired by Cooper Industries in 1981 and spun off Belden as an independent company in 1993. In 2004 the company merged with Cable Design Technologies forming Belden CDT Inc. (now Belden Inc.) and since then the company has been headquartered in St. Louis. In 2005 John Stroup became CEO.

Acquisitions
Belden expanded in the 21st century through a number of corporate acquisitions:

In early 2007, Belden purchased Hirschmann Automation and Control, an industrial marketing company focused on industrial automation and networking systems, for $260 million.

In the summer of 2007, Belden acquired Lumberg Automation, which manufactures connectors used in industrial automation, for an undisclosed price.

In June 2008, Belden purchased wireless LAN vendor Trapeze for $113 million.

In December 2009, Belden purchased Telecast Fiber Systems, a manufacturer of fiber-optic systems for television broadcast production, for an undisclosed price.

In late 2010, Belden acquired GarrettCom, an industrial networking products manufacturer, for $52 million.

In late 2010, Belden purchased Thomas & Betts Corporation, a coax connectivity and communications products company, $78 million.

In November 2010, Belden purchased the communications products business of broadcast connector manufacturer Thomas & Betts of Memphis, Tennessee for $78 million.

In December 2010, Belden divested its wireless business to Juniper Networks.

In April 2011, Belden expanded its presence in South America with the acquisition of Poliron, a Brazilian cable company for $30 million.

In September 2011, Belden acquired SCADA, a security solutions provider, and Byres Security, makers of the Tofino brand industrial security solutions, for $7 million.

In June 2012, Belden acquired Miranda Technologies, a global provider of hardware and software solutions for the broadcast television, cable, satellite and IPTV industries, for $377 million.

In December 2012, Belden purchased PPC, a developer and manufacturer of connectivity solutions for the broadband service provider market, for $515.7 million.

In early 2014, Belden acquired Grass Valley, a manufacturer of end-to-end broadcast solutions, for $220 million.

In December 2014, Belden said it would buy Tripwire for $710 million. The deal, which closed in the first quarter of 2015 , allowed the companies to deliver cybersecurity solutions across industrial and broadcast markets.

In early 2021, Belden acquired OTN Systems, a Belgium based manufacturer of critical telecommunication equipment, for $71 million.

References

External links
 

Companies listed on the New York Stock Exchange
Electronics companies of the United States
Signal connectors
Wire and cable manufacturers
Manufacturing companies based in Missouri
Companies based in St. Louis County, Missouri
Electronics companies established in 1902
1902 establishments in Illinois